Gibarac is a village in Serbia. It is situated in the Šid municipality, in the Srem District, Vojvodina province. The village has a Serb ethnic majority and its population numbering 1,158 people (2002 census).

History
According to demographic research, Gibarac exists under this same name since 1370. Before the Yugoslav wars, the village had Croat ethnic majority.

See also
List of places in Serbia
List of cities, towns and villages in Vojvodina

References

Populated places in Syrmia